The following is a list of female attorneys general of states in the United States. Since 1959, there have been 34 states which have appointed or elected women as attorneys-general. Puerto Rico has had a record four women hold office as attorney general, the most of any U.S. state or territory. Anne X. Alpern of Pennsylvania is the first woman to hold office as the attorney-general of a state. Fourteen U.S. states have had at least two women serve as attorneys-general, with both Hawaii and Pennsylvania having the most at three each.

List of female attorneys general of states

Female territorial attorneys general

References

State Attorneys General